Elastic Planet is a six-part radio comedy series, first broadcast on BBC Radio 4 in 1995, taking the form of a surreal documentary reminiscent of Connections. It was written by Ben Moor, narrated by Oliver Postgate and produced by Jon Naismith.

The series deals with subjects such as the decline of the British dust industry, bad spelling rings and cheese sculpture.

The series has been repeated on BBC 7 and BBC Radio 4 Extra on various occasions.

Cast
Various roles in the show are taken on by the cast members Ben Moor, Dan Strauss, Kerry Shale, and Michael Troughton. Others appearing included Neil Mullarkey, Geoffrey McGivern, Miriam Margolyes, Rebecca Front, Fiona Allen, Doon Mackichan and Alexander Armstrong

Episode guide
 The Babies
 The Train
 The Shape
 The Zoo 
 The Objects
 The Travel

References

External links
 
  The Elastic Planet  homepage by the author, Ben Moor

BBC Radio 4 programmes
BBC Radio comedy programmes
1995 radio programme debuts
Surreal comedy radio series
Mockumentaries